Calatrava la Nueva is a medieval castle and convent found on the peak of Alacranejo, within the municipality of Aldea del Rey, near Almagro, in the province of Ciudad Real, Spain.

Its name is a reference to the Order of Calatrava, which was originally situated in Calatrava la Vieja, 60 km to the north.  In 1217, the Order of Calatrava moved to Calatrava la Nueva.  Thus, the original site became known as Calatrava la Vieja ("Old Calatrava") and the new site as Calatrava la Nueva (“New Calatrava”).

Burials 
Alfonso of Molina

Gallery

External links 

 Information on the church
 Historia del castillo y galería fotográfica en www.castillosnet.org
 Galería Fotográfica en www.ciudad-real.es
 Interveciones arquitectónicas en el Sacro Convento de Calatrava La Nueva, durante la segunda mitad del siglo XVIII - artículo del nº 23-24 Cuadernos de Estudios Manchegos

Castles in Castilla–La Mancha
Buildings and structures in the Province of Ciudad Real
Monasteries in Castilla–La Mancha